Kineton High School is a mixed secondary school located in South Warwickshire, England within the village of Kineton. It is a non-selective academy school with a sixth form.

History
Prior to the school's construction, the village school had moved from premises to premises to meet the growth in enrolment. Students from Kineton and surrounding villages transferred to the newly built school when it opened. The school building has remained largely the same since then. A swimming pool was built with help from the local community in 1972 with money raised by students doing a sponsored walk. In October 1998, a cobweb was found to be covering the 4.54 hectare playing field, giving it the world record for the largest spider web outdoors. Specialist Sports College status was obtained in 2003. The school celebrated its 50th anniversary in 2008. There was a fire in the sports centre in 2009. An artificial turf pitch for use in P.E. was built on the field in the early 2010s. A new science block was completed in 2017, replacing seven dilapidated mobile classrooms, the most significant development at the school in 40 years. The school became an academy in September 2019, joining Stowe Valley Multi Academy Trust, having been a community school run by Warwickshire County Council previously. BBC Midlands Today interviewed students for a report on schools staying open during the COVID-19 pandemic in November 2020.

Headteachers
There have been six headteachers since the school opened:

Rebuild
The school is to be rebuilt after being named one of the first 50 schools chosen as part of the Government's School Rebuilding Programme. All the school buildings are set to be demolished with the exception of the science block, which was completed in 2017, and replaced by a new three-storey teaching block and sports hall.

Academic performance
In 2013 the school was in the Specialist Schools and Academies Trust list of top 20 per cent of schools for high attainment in end of Key Stage 4 and the Financial Times’ top 1,000 schools list for post 16 performance.

International links
The school is partnered with Sanghamitta Balika Vidyalaya, a girls' school in Sri Lanka.

Notable former pupils
 William Beck (actor)
 Andy Palmer (former CEO of Aston Martin)

References

External links
School website
DfE information

Secondary schools in Warwickshire
Educational institutions established in 1958
1958 establishments in England
Academies in Warwickshire